Punta Prieta Airstrip is a public paved airstrip located South of Punta Prieta, Municipality of Ensenada, Baja California, Mexico, a small town located just in the middle of The Valle de los Cirios Protected Natural Area, beside the Federal Highway 1. The runway runs north–south, parallel to the highway. The airfield is used solely for general aviation purposes.

External links
Baja Bush Pilots forum about Punta Prieta Airstrip.
Info about The Valle de los Cirios Protected Natural Area.

Airports in Baja California